Fousseny Kamissoko (born 5 April 1983) is a former professional footballer who played as a defender.

Career 
Kamissoko played for ASC Bouaké, COD Meknès, AS Salé, Suwaiq Club and Al-Shabab SC.

Born in Abidjan, Ivory Coast, Kamissoko is of Malian heritage and was naturalized as a Equatoguinean citizen. He was a member of the Equatorial Guinea national team and was part of the squad at the 2012 Africa Cup of Nations.

References

External links
 
 
 

1983 births
Living people
Footballers from Abidjan
Ivorian footballers
Ivorian people of Malian descent
Association football defenders
COD Meknès players
Suwaiq Club players
Al-Shabab SC (Seeb) players
Ivorian expatriate footballers
Ivorian expatriate sportspeople in Morocco
Equatoguinean expatriate sportspeople in Morocco
Expatriate footballers in Morocco
Ivorian expatriate sportspeople in Oman
Equatoguinean expatriate sportspeople in Oman
Expatriate footballers in Oman
Naturalized citizens of Equatorial Guinea
Equatoguinean footballers
Equatoguinean expatriate footballers
Equatorial Guinea international footballers
2012 Africa Cup of Nations players